Music for Egon Schiele is the second album by the instrumental group Rachel's, released in 1996.

The album was composed as the score to a theatrical production, Egon Schiele, about the life of the painter Egon Schiele. It was staged by the Itinerant Theater Guild, in 1995.

Critical reception

The Village Voice called the album "a haunting array of compositions that attempt to narrate the elements of Schiele's life through cello, piano, viola, and bass." Rolling Stone noted that "the music is as stark and loving as Schiele's art, the sound of a noble, lonely agony rendered in elegant monochrome."

AllMusic wrote that "it is to pianist Rachel Grimes' credit that her pieces convey a stirring sense of drama and vivid imagery that perfectly match her subject."

Track listing
 "Family Portrait" – 5:41
 "Egon & Gertie" – 3:02
 "First Self-Portrait Series" – 3:47
 "Mime Van Osen" – 3:05
 "Second Self-Portrait Series"  – 2:30
 "Wally, Egon & Models in the Studio" – 4:41
 "Promenade" – 8:24
 "Third Self-Portrait Series" – 2:23
 "Egon, Edith & Wally Meet" – 2:41
 "Egon & Wally Embrace and Say Farewell" – 3:09
 "Egon & Edith" – 2:55
 "Second Family Portrait" – 4:45

References

Rachel's albums
1996 albums
Quarterstick Records albums